Erich Schumacher (24 December 1908 – 5 September 1986) was a German theatre director.

Career 
Schumacher was born in Kenzingen. When in the period of National Socialism Schumacher took over the direction of the Pfalztheater in Kaiserslautern at the age of 29 (1938), he was Germany's youngest artistic director. From 1949 until 1958, he was general director of the Theater Krefeld und Mönchengladbach.

From 1958 to 1974, Schumacher held the same position at the Grillo-Theater. Together with his dramaturge , he set artistic accents that shaped the theatre in Essen until the 1980s. He worked for many years with the general music director Gustav König as well as the directors Paul Hager, Claus Leininger and the choreographer .

His time in Essen is also linked to the names of Jean Genet, Paul Claudel, Rolf Hochhuth and Peter Weiss, some of whose pieces were even premiered in Essen.

Schumacher died in Essen at the age of 77.

Further reading 
 Franz Feldens: 75 Jahre Städtische Bühnen Essen Geschichte des Essener Theaters 1892–1967. Rheinisch-Westfälische Verlagsgesellschaft, 1967.
 Helga Mohaupt, Rudolf Majer-Finkes: Das Grillo-Theater: Geschichte eines Essener Theaterbaus. 1892–1990; mit Dokumentation von Rudolf Majer-Finkes; Bonn: Bouvier, 1990, 
 : Essen spielt Theater: 1000 und einhundert Jahre; zum 100. Geburtstag des Grillo-Theaters. Vol. 1 (1992) and vol. 2 (1994), ECON-Verlag,

References

External links 
 

German theatre directors
Nazi Party members
Officers Crosses of the Order of Merit of the Federal Republic of Germany
1908 births
1986 deaths
People from Freiburg im Breisgau